Xylia mendoncae is a species of flowering plant in the family Fabaceae. It is found only in Mozambique.

References

mendoncae
Flora of Mozambique
Data deficient plants
Endemic flora of Mozambique
Taxonomy articles created by Polbot